"Ever, Never Lovin' You" is a song co-written and recorded by American country music artist Ed Bruce.  It was released in July 1982 as the first single from his album I Write It Down.  The song reached number 4 on the Billboard Hot Country Singles chart.  Bruce wrote the song with his wife Patsy and Glenn Ray.

Chart performance

References

1982 singles
1982 songs
Ed Bruce songs
Songs written by Ed Bruce
Song recordings produced by Tommy West (producer)
MCA Records singles
Songs written by Patsy Bruce